State Route 26 (SR 26) was a state highway in Los Angeles and Orange counties in the U.S. state of California, from 1937 to 1964. It traveled from U.S. Route 101 Alternate (US 101 Alt.) in Santa Monica to SR 39 in Buena Park.

The route was assigned pre-1964 Legislative Route 173 (LR 173), defined in 1933 from Santa Monica to East Los Angeles. Between Santa Monica and Los Angeles, it was later replaced by the Santa Monica Freeway, and added to the Interstate Highway System on September 15, 1955. East of East Los Angeles, it was assigned LR 166.

The highway originally traveled along 10th Street in Los Angeles, but as Olympic Boulevard was built out to the west and east, it was aligned to that. East of Los Angeles, the highway turned southeast along the Anaheim Telegraph Road, which it followed into Santa Fe Springs. It then continued along Los Nietos Road, Valley View Avenue, and Stage Road before its terminus at La Habra Road (now Beach Boulevard). The portion east of Downtown Los Angeles was eventually deleted from the system as redundant to US 101 Byp. which later became Interstate 5 (I-5).

The highway was known as State Route 6 from 1934 to 1937. The current SR 26 bears no relation to this highway.

Major intersections

See also

References

026
Roads in Los Angeles County, California
Roads in Orange County, California
Transportation in Santa Monica, California
Buena Park, California
Santa Fe Springs, California
Interstate 10